Ayaba Cho Lucas (born August  1972) is an Ambazonian activist. He is the former Secretary  General  of the  Southern Cameroons Youth League (SCYL) and is the current  leader of Ambazonia Governing Council, a separatist organization in Southern Cameroons.Ayaba was expelled from the University of Buea in 1993 because he had led a one-man demonstration against tuition increases; he has been in exile from Cameroon since then. He eventually ended up in Norway, where he studied human rights and development at the Norwegian University of Life Sciences, and from where he has based his activism ever since. In January 2017, Ayaba was allegedly targeted for assassination in Brussels, Belgium.

Anglophone Crisis

As leader of the Ambazonia Governing Council, Ayaba and Chairman Benedict Kuah oversaw the creation of the Ambazonia Defence Forces, which carried out its first guerilla action on September 9, 2017. This was the first armed action by Ambazonian separatists in what would become known as the Anglophone Crisis. This happened seven weeks before the Interim Government of Ambazonia was established, and months before it endorsed an armed struggle.

The AGC's relationship with the Interim Government was oftentimes strained. In March 2019, Ayaba refused to attend the  All Southern Cameroons People’s General Conference in Washington, D.C., calling some of the attendants "enablers". The AGC did thus not become part of the Southern Cameroons Liberation Council. During the 2019 Ambazonian leadership crisis, Ayaba supported Sisiku Julius Ayuk Tabe against Samuel Ikome Sako "out of principle". Ayaba argued that it was wrong to attack Ayuk Tabe, who had been under detention since January 2018.

In July 2019, Ayaba claimed that Cameroon had practically lost the war, and that separatist forces controlled 80 percent of the Anglophone regions.

On April 9, 2021, Ayaba held a joint press conference with Nnamdi Kanu, leader of the Indigenous People of Biafra (IPOB), where they declared an alliance between Biafra and Ambazonia. Ayaba has also proposed an alliance with democratic forces within Cameroon, proposing that Ambazonia should help overthrow Paul Biya.

In March 2022, Ayaba Lucas Cho presented himself, on his Twitter page, as the sponsor of the terrorist attack of Ekondo Titi, which caused the death of seven people, including the sub-prefect and the mayor of this city. in the South West region of Cameroon.

Publication

References

External links
Book Presentation "Not Guilty" An African Refugee Experience, thevoiceforum.org

1972 births
20th-century English people
21st-century English people
Living people
Ambazonian independence activists
People from Northwest Region (Cameroon)